Sirdal is a municipality in Agder county, Norway. It is located in the northwestern part of the traditional district of Lister. The administrative centre of the municipality is the village of Tonstad. Other villages in Sirdal include Bjørnestad, Haughom, Kvæven, Lunde, and Tjørhom.

The  municipality is the 52nd largest by area out of the 356 municipalities in Norway. Sirdal is the 291st most populous municipality in Norway with a population of 1,810.

General information

The old parish of Sirdal was first established as a municipality in 1849 when it was separated from the large municipality of Bakke. Initially, Sirdal had 1,804 residents. On 1 January 1903, a small area of Sirdal (population: 63) was transferred to the neighboring municipality of Fjotland. On 1 January 1905, the municipality of Sirdal was dissolved and its territories were divided into two new municipalities: Tonstad (population: 828) and Øvre Sirdal (population: 753). These large, sparsely populated municipalities merged along with the Øksendal area of Bakke municipality to recreate the municipality of Sirdal on 1 January 1960. This time, Sirdal started out with a population of 1,426. On 1 January 1987, the Virak and Espetveit areas of northern Flekkefjord (population: 41) were transferred to Sirdal municipality.

Name
The municipality is named after the Sirdalen valley which runs through it. The first element is the genitive case of the river name Síra (now the Sira river). The last element is dalr which means "valley" or "dale". The meaning of the river name is unknown (maybe "strong stream").

Coat of arms
The coat of arms was granted on 17 January 1986. The official blazon is "Vert three ptarmigans volant argent". This means the arms have a green field (background) and the charge is a willow ptarmigan (Lagopus lagopus). The ptarmigan has a tincture of argent which means it is commonly colored white, but if it is made out of metal, then silver is used. The green color in the field and the ptarmigans were chosen as a symbol for the hills and moorland which make up the largest part of the municipality. The willow ptarmigan is a typical bird for the area. The arms were designed by Stein Davidsen.

Churches

The Church of Norway has one parish within the municipality of Sirdal. It is part of the Lister og Mandal prosti (deanery) in the Diocese of Agder og Telemark.

Geography
Sirdal municipality includes the westernmost valley in Agder county, bordering Rogaland county to the west. To the south, it borders on the municipality of Flekkefjord and to the east is Kvinesdal. Sirdal is the largest municipality by area in Agder. Lakes in the region include Gravatnet, Kulivatnet, Kvifjorden, Øyarvatnet, Rosskreppfjorden, Sirdalsvatnet, and Valevatn. The mountain Urddalsknuten lies at the northern end of the municipality.

In 1990, the mountain road opened between the Sirdalen valley and the Setesdal valley over the Suleskard mountain pass. It connected Sirdal to Brokke in the neighboring municipality of Valle to the east.

Climate

Government
All municipalities in Norway, including Sirdal, are responsible for primary education (through 10th grade), outpatient health services, senior citizen services, unemployment and other social services, zoning, economic development, and municipal roads. The municipality is governed by a municipal council of elected representatives, which in turn elect a mayor.  The municipality falls under the Dalane District Court and the Gulating Court of Appeal.

Municipal council
The municipal council of Sirdal is made up of 19 representatives that are elected to four year terms. Currently, the party breakdown is as follows:

Economy

The main source of income for Sirdal is the Sira-Kvina Power Company which gets its power from the big Sira and Kvina rivers. The waterfalls on the river Sira are utilized in four power stations owned by Sira-Kvina power company. The company also owns three power stations in the Kvina river system, hence the company's name. The largest power station, Tonstad Hydroelectric Power Station, was inaugurated in 1968, with two units, each producing . Sira-Kvina power company applied in 2007 for concession to expand the power station with two new units (reversible turbines), each containing , and the concession is pending.

Tourism is also an important source of income for the Sirdal economy, taking advantage of the extensive mountains, mountainous plateaus, lakes, and great views. There are multiple alpine resorts and hotels in the valley, as well as cottages and camping spots. Winter activities include six ski resorts for winter enjoyment. Downhill ski areas include Tjørhomfjellet, Bjørnestad Ski Centre, Ålsheia Ski Centre, Fidjeland Ski Centre, and Ådneram Ski lift. Cross-country skiers can enjoy dozens of trails over spectacular terrain. Summer activities include hiking, horseback riding, and river rafting.

History
From the oldest times the Sirdalen valley was divided by the river Sira with Rogaland county controlling the west side and Agder county controlling the east side. The two sides of the valley, however, was established as one single parish in Christian times, even though it crossed county lines, something that was not very common in Norway.

In 1837, it was decided that every parish should be a municipality, but no municipality should belong to more than one county (see formannskapsdistrikt law). Sirdal parish was therefore first divided in two municipalities. This was a bad decision because they had very few inhabitants separately. A new solution was found in 1839 when the two municipalities were re-joined, and the county border was moved so that all of Sirdalen was in Vest-Agder county.

At Kvæven, in northern Sirdal one finds the Sirdal Mountain Museum. This museum has a collection of old Sirdal buildings. Former lifestyles are visible in the farmhouse, a schoolhouse, stable, blacksmith's shop, barn, and mountain farm cottage as well as original equipment.

Notable residents
 Berit Kvæven (born 1942 in Øvre Sirdal) a sivilingeniør and politician
 Gunnar Tjomlid (born 1974) a skeptic, secular humanist, blogger, and author; brought up in Sirdal
 Linda Grubben (born 1979) a World Cup biathlete 
 Arild Haugen (born 1985 in Sirdal) a boxer and former strongman

International relations

Twin towns — Sister cities
 Väike-Maarja Parish, Estonia (since 1994)

References

External links

Municipal fact sheet from Statistics Norway 
Map of Sirdal
Sirdal Mountain Museum
Sirdal Mountain Museum, Official Website 
SirdalsNett - All you need to know about Sirdal 
Sirdalsferie - Information for tourists
Sirdal kommune 
To & From Sirdal Transport Map

 
Municipalities of Agder
1849 establishments in Norway
Valleys of Agder
Ski areas and resorts in Norway